The Taiwan lesser salamander (Hynobius fuca) is a species of salamander in the family Hynobiidae, endemic to Taiwan. The Taiwan lesser salamander is known from four localities in the central and northern part of the Syueshan Mountain Range; it appears to be scarce. They live on densely shaded, moist forests and are found along mountain creeks or under rocks or rotting wood.

The Taiwan lesser salamander is relatively short, but robust. They breed in winter and early spring. Females lay egg capsules that both males and females appear to guard until they hatch.

References

Amphiweb: Information on Amphibian Biology and Conservation. 2008, Berkeley, California. Hynobius fuca Downloaded on 20 September 2009.

Hynobius
Amphibians described in 2008
Amphibians of Taiwan
Endemic fauna of Taiwan
Taxa named by Kuang-yang Lue